The 2002 Danish Figure Skating Championships was held from January 25 to 27, 2002. Skaters competed in the disciplines of men's singles and ladies' singles. Not all disciplines were held on all levels due to a lack of participants.

Senior results

Men

Ladies

External links
 results

Danish Figure Skating Championships
Danish Figure Skating Championships, 2002
Figure Skating Championships